The 2012–13 season was Berwick Rangers's eighth consecutive season in the Scottish Third Division, having been relegated from the Scottish Second Division at the end of the 2004–05 season. Berwick also competed in the Challenge Cup, League Cup and the Scottish Cup.

Summary

Season
Berwick Rangers finished fourth in the Scottish Third Division, entering the play-offs losing 3–2 to East Fife on aggregate in the Semi-final. They reached the first round of the Challenge Cup, the first round of the League Cup and the third round of the Scottish Cup.

Results & fixtures

Pre-season

Scottish Third Division

Second Division play-offs

Scottish Challenge Cup

Scottish League Cup

Scottish Cup

Player statistics

Squad 
Last updated 13 May 2013 

|}
a.  Includes other competitive competitions, including the play-offs and the Challenge Cup.

Disciplinary record
Includes all competitive matches.
Last updated 13 May 2013

Team statistics

League table

Division summary

Transfers

Players in

Players out

References

Berwick Rangers F.C. seasons
Berwick Rangers